The 1951 Iowa Hawkeyes football team represented the University of Iowa in the 1951 Big Ten Conference football season. This season was Leonard Raffensperger's last season as head coach.

Schedule

References

Iowa
Iowa Hawkeyes football seasons
Iowa Hawkeyes football